Olivier Diomandé (born  April 6, 1974 in Lyon, France) is a French-born Ivorian rugby union player. He plays as a hooker.

Diomandé played for Club Sportif Annonay (1992/93-1993/94), US Romans (1994/95-1996/97), Stade Français (1997/98), RC Nîmes (1998/99-1999/2000), Bègles-Bordeaux (2000/01-2001/02), Montpellier Hérault (2002/03-2007/08), Racing Métro 92 (2007/08-2009/10) and RC Nîmes, since 2010/11, at the Fédérale 2. He won the Pro D2 with Montpellier Hérault, in 2002/03, and the European Challenge Cup, in 2004. He won again the Pro D2 for Racing Métro 92, in 2008/09.

He plays for Côte d'Ivoire at international level.

External links
Olivier Diomandé Data

1974 births
Living people
Ivorian rugby union players
Montpellier Hérault Rugby players
Rugby union hookers
Sportspeople from Lyon
Ivorian expatriate rugby union players
Expatriate rugby union players in France
Ivorian expatriate sportspeople in France
CA Bordeaux-Bègles Gironde players